Hollywood Trials was an observational documentary series which ran on RTÉ Two Ireland, in 2008.

The series followed ten Irish actors trying to break into Hollywood. The participants lived together as a group for four weeks as they were groomed and coached by experts in the field, including audition coach Margie Haber, who was also part of the selection panel which included Declan Lowney and Ros Hubbard. The programme concluded with a few of the actors, including Green and Ateh receiving offers from Hollywood agents.

Hollywood Trials was produced for RTÉ by Red Pepper Productions.

Participants
 Annemarie Gaillard
 Audrey McCoy
 Cat Lundy 
 Chris Newman
 Emmett J. Scanlan
 George McMahon 
 Holly White
 Joe McKinney 
 Michael Graham 
 Susan Ateh (actor)

References

2008 Irish television series debuts
Irish reality television series
RTÉ original programming
2008 Irish television series endings